Podlopatki is a rural locality (a selo) in Mukhorshibirsky District, Republic of Buryatia, Russia. The population was 1,006 as of 2010. There are 11 streets.

Geography 
Podlopatki is located 74 km west of Mukhorshibir (the district's administrative centre) by road. Bilyutay and Ust-Altasha are the nearest rural localities.

References 

Rural localities in Mukhorshibirsky District